Levi Opdam (born 3 May 1996) is a Dutch professional footballer who plays as a right back. Besides the Netherlands, he has played in France.

Career
In January 2019, Opdam signed a five-month contract with Paris Saint-Germain. He left the club on 22 August 2019, to join TOP Oss. However, the club announced on 9 January 2020, that his contract had been terminated by mutual agreement.

As of April 2021, Opdam was working at a bed factory and hoping to return to professional football.

References

1996 births
Living people
Dutch people of Indonesian descent
Sportspeople from Alkmaar
Dutch footballers
Footballers from North Holland
Association football fullbacks
Association football midfielders
Netherlands youth international footballers
Eredivisie players
Eerste Divisie players
Tweede Divisie players
Championnat National 2 players
AZ Alkmaar players
Jong AZ players
Go Ahead Eagles players
TOP Oss players
Dutch expatriate footballers
Dutch expatriate sportspeople in France
Expatriate footballers in France